Acrolophus micromacha is a moth of the family Acrolophidae. It is found in Costa Rica.

References

Moths described in 1932
micromacha